Newlands is an affluent suburb in the south side of Glasgow, Scotland. The area is mainly residential in character. Shawlands and Langside lie to the north of the district (the White Cart Water forming the boundary), Pollokshaws and Auldhouse to the west, Giffnock (East Renfrewshire) to the south, and Merrylee and Cathcart to the east.

Features

It has many traditional shops which include The Newlands Cafe. One of the Glasgow Academy preparatory schools is located Newlands, located in a blonde sandstone villa, a type of house extremely common in this area. There was previously a Glasgow Corporation Tramways depot on the site from the 1910s.

 
Newlands has several churches, a bowling club, a tennis club and a park which has tennis courts. The Newlands fete is held annually and takes place within Newlands Park.

Notable residents include Ricky Ross and Kelly Macdonald

History
The district originated as farmland in Cathcart Parish (on the opposite side of the White Cart Water from Pollokshaws, which was in Eastwood Parish). The working farm buildings such as the stables, byre and dairy were situated at the "Mains of Newlands". The area was incorporated into the city of Glasgow officially in 1912.

References

External links

Newlands and Auldhouse Community Council
Newlands and Merrylee - Illustrated Guide

Areas of Glasgow
Parks and commons in Glasgow